Stillingfleet is a surname, and may refer to:

Edward Stillingfleet (1635–1699), English theologian and scholar, author of Unreasonableness of Separation
Edward Stillingfleet (physician) (1660–1708), English physician and clergyman
Benjamin Stillingfleet (1702–1771), English botanist, translator and author
 James Stillingfleet (priest, born 1674) (1674–1746), Dean of Worcester
 James Stillingfleet (priest, born 1741) (1741–1826), English evangelical cleric

See also
 Stillingfleet, village in North Yorkshire, England